"Love on a Mountain Top" is a 1968 song by singer Robert Knight. The song was written by Buzz Cason and Mac Gayden, who also penned "Everlasting Love". However, it only charted regionally in the Philadelphia and Pittsburgh area. Re-discovered by the UK's Northern soul scene, it got airplay by DJs in late 1973, causing a UK re-release of the record, where the song eventually entered the UK Singles Chart and peaked at number 10 in January 1974.

Sinitta version

A cover version of "Love on a Mountain Top" by American-born pop singer Sinitta appeared in 1989, produced by Phil Harding and Ian Curnow. It was released as the third single from Sinitta's second album, Wicked (1988). Her version of the song reached number 20 on the UK Singles Chart, and number 81 in Australia on the ARIA chart.

Critical reception
Bill Coleman from Billboard stated that the "hi-NRG/crossover diva is back with a predictable but nonetheless charming track from her new album." Richard Lowe from Smash Hits felt the 12" "sounds uncannily like "Numero Uno" by Starlight, and is "yet another ropy version of a fantastic old song".

Formats and track listings
 CD single
"Love on a Mountain Top" – 3:25
"Love on a Mountain Top" (An Everlasting Knight Mix) – 7:45
"Love on a Mountain Top" (Extended Club Mix) – 5:48
"Love on a Mountain Top" (Bonus Beats Mix) – 4:16
"Don't Tell Me Not to Cry" (Extended Version) – 5:02

 7" single
"Love on a Mountain Top" – 3:25
"Don't Tell Me Not to Cry" – 3:55

 12" single
"Love on a Mountain Top" (An Everlasting Knight Mix) – 7:45
"Don't Tell Me Not to Cry" (Extended Version) – 5:02

Charts

References

1968 songs
1989 singles
Robert Knight (musician) songs
Sinitta songs
Songs written by Mac Gayden
Songs written by Buzz Cason
Song recordings produced by Phil Harding (producer)
Fanfare Records singles
Northern soul songs